Adams Publishing Group LLC (APG) is a company that provides publishing services, including newspapers, periodicals, and website publishing in the United States. Its corporate headquarters is located in Coon Rapids, Minnesota. Mark Adams, the son of Stephen Adams, founded Adams Publishing Group in late 2013. In March 2014, APG began to acquire newspapers and media related businesses. As of 2022, it owned more than 127 newspapers in 20 states and the District of Columbia.

Acquisitions
In 2014, Adams Publishing Group acquired 34 publications from American Consolidated Media. Later in 2014, Adams Publishing acquired newspapers in southern Minnesota from Huckle Publishing including Chronotype Publishing in Rice Lake, Wisconsin and Athens News (Athens, Ohio). In 2015, Adams Publishing Group purchased the Dundalk Eagle in Maryland.

In 2015, Adams purchased Southern Maryland Newspapers and Comprint Military Publications from The Washington Post. In October 2015, Adams purchased the newspapers of the McCraken Newspaper Group, which included the Wyoming Tribune Eagle and the Laramie Boomerang. In November 2015, Adams purchased the Post Company, which published the daily Idaho Post Register and weekly newspapers Shelley Pioneer, Challis Messenger, and Jefferson Star. In December 2015, Adams purchased The Crescent-News in Defiance, Ohio. In 2016, Adams purchased ECM Publishers, Inc, a Minnesota-based publisher of 50 community newspapers, and Jones Media, a Tennessee-based publisher of 10 community newspapers.

In 2017, Adams acquired a group of newspapers in Mount Airy, North Carolina and The Carroll News in Virginia from Champion Media. In October 2017, Adams announced its acquisition of the Pioneer News Group.

In 2018, Adams acquired Cooke Communications. In June 2019, Adams purchased the Janesville Gazette and the Marinette Eagle Herald in Wisconsin from Bliss Communications.

Disputes
Adams Publishing Group fired the news editor of Athens (Ohio) News in February 2022 for running a warning that an advertisement placed by Adam’s national ad desk for a collectible coin operation could be fraudulent. Adams Publishing Group disputed the claims of the former editor of Athens (Ohio) News regarding the reasons surrounding the dismissal.

Adams family
Mark Adams, CEO, is a third generation media person.  His grandfather, Cedric Adams, was active in radio, television, and newspapers.  His father, Stephen Adams, graduated from Stanford Business School in 1962 and owns a company that specializing in advertising and outdoor equipment.

Media publications
Adams Publishing Group has three Divisions: East (Nickolas Monico, Divisional President), Central (Jeff Patterson, Divisional President), and West (Nickolas Monico, Divisional President).  The newspapers owned by APG in each division are listed below, along with the location of the newspaper and its publication frequency.  APG also publishes numerous magazines and advertising publications.

APG East

Delaware
Newark Post, Newark, DE, Weekly

Florida
The Arcadian, Arcadia, FL, Weekly
The Charlotte Sun, Port Charlotte, FL, Daily
Charlotte Sun Times, Port Charlotte, FL, Weekly
 The Englewood Sun, Englewood, FL, Daily
 The Florida Keys Free Press, Tavernier, FL, Weekly
 The Key West Citizen, Key West, FL, Monday-Saturday
 The North Port Sun, North Port, FL, Daily
 The Punta Gorda Herald, Port Charlotte, FL, Weekly
 The Venice Gondolier Sun, Venice, FL, Twice Weekly
 West Villages Sun, North Port, FL, Weekly

Maryland
 The Avenue News, Essex, MD, Weekly
 The Susquehanna Press, Elkton, MD, Weekly
 Bay Times/Record Observer, Chester, MD, Weekly
 The Southern Maryland News, La Plata, MD, Weekly
 Cecil Whig, Elkton, MD, Twice Weekly
 Dorchester Star, Cambridge, MD, Weekly
 The Dundalk Eagle, Dundalk, MD, Weekly
 The Enquirer/Andrews-Gazette, Largo, MD, Weekly
 Kent County News, Chestertown, MD, Weekly
 The Star Democrat, Easton, MD, Daily
 Tester Naval Air Station at Patuxent River, California, MD, Weekly

Michigan
 The Gladwin County Record and Beaverton Clarion, Gladwin, MI, Weekly

North Carolina
 Ashe Post & Times, West Jefferson, NC, Weekly
 The Avery Journal Times, Avery County, NC, Weekly
 Bertie Ledger-Advance, Windsor, NC, Weekly
 The Blowing Rocket, Blowing Rock, NC, Weekly
 Chowan Herald, Edenton, NC, Weekly
 The Daily Advance, Elizabeth City, NC, Daily
 The Daily Reflector, Greenville, NC, Daily
 Duplin Times, Kenansville, NC, Weekly
 The Farmville Enterprise, Farmville, NC, Weekly
 The Mount Airy News, Mount Airy, NC, Daily
 Martin County Enterprise & Weekly Herald, Williamston, NC, Weekly
 The Mountain Times, Boone, Watauga County, NC, Weekly
 The Perquimans Weekly, Hertford, NC, Weekly
 The Pilot, Mounty Airy, NC
 Rocky Mount Telegram, Rocky Mount, NC
 The Standard Laconic, Snow Hill, NC, Weekly
 The Stokes News, King, NC, Weekly
 The Tarboro Weekly, Tarboro, NC, Weekly
 The Times-Leader, Ayden, NC, Weekly
 The Tribune, Elkin, NC, Weekly
 Watauga Democrat, Boone, NC, Twice weekly
 The Yadkin Ripple, Yadkinville, NC, Weekly

Ohio:
 The Athens Messenger, Athens, OH, Daily
 The Athens News, Athens, OH, Twice weekly
 Circleville Herald, Logan, OH, Daily
 The Crescent-News, Defiance, OH, Daily
 The Logan Daily News, Logan, OH, Daily
 Perry County Tribune, New Lexington, OH, Weekly
 The Pike County News Watchman, Waverly, OH, Twice weekly
 The Vinton County Courier, McArthur, OH, Weekly

Tennessee:
 The Advocate & Democrat, Sweetwater, TN, Twice weekly
 The Connection, Tellico Village, TN, Weekly
 The Daily Post-Athenian, Athens, TN, Daily
 The Daily Times, Maryville, TN, Daily
 The Greeneville Sun, Greeneville, TN, Daily
 The Herald-News, Dayton, TN, Twice weekly
 The Newport Plain Talk, Newport, TN, Tri-Weekly
 News-Herald, Loudon County, TN, Weekly
 The Rogersville Review, Rogersville, TN, Twice weekly
 Touring Publications, Sevierville, TN, Travel and Tourism

Virginia:
 The Carroll News, Hillsville, VA, Weekly
 Pentagram, Fort Myer, VA, Weekly

APG West

Idaho:
 Boise Weekly, Boise, ID, Weekly
 Challis Messenger, Challis, ID, Weekly
 Idaho Press Tribune, Nampa, ID, Daily
 Idaho State Journal, Pocatello, ID, Daily
 Jefferson Star, Rigby, ID, Weekly
 Kuna Melba News, Kuna, ID, Weekly
 Meridian Press, Meridian, ID, Weekly
 Messenger Index, Emmett, ID, Weekly
 News-Examiner, Montpelier, ID, Weekly
 Post Register, Idaho Falls, ID, Daily
 Preston Citizen, Preston, ID, Weekly
 Standard Journal, Rexburg, ID, Twice weekly
 Teton Valley News, Driggs, ID, Weekly

Montana:
 Belgrade News, Belgrade, MT, Weekly
 Bozeman Daily Chronicle, Bozeman, MT, Daily

Oregon:
 Herald and News, Klamath Falls, OR, Daily
 Lake County Examiner, Lakeview, OR, Weekly

Utah:
 The Herald Journal, Logan, UT, Daily
 The Leader, Tremonton, UT, Weekly

Washington:
 Anacortes American, Anacortes, WA, Weekly
 Argus, Burlington, WA, Weekly
 Courier Times, Sedro-Woolley, WA, Weekly
 Daily Record, Ellensburg, WA, Daily
 Skagit Valley Herald, Mount Vernon, WA, Daily
 Stanwood Camano News, Stanwood, WA, Weekly

Wyoming:
 Laramie Boomerang, Laramie, WY, Daily
 Rawlins Daily Times, Rawlins, WY, Twice Weekly
 Rock Springs Rocket Miner, Rock Springs, WY, Twice Weekly
 Wyoming Tribune-Eagle, Cheyenne, WY, Daily

APG Central

Minnesota
 Aitkin Independent Age, Aitkin, Weekly
 Apple Valley Sun ThisWeek, Apple Valley, Weekly
 Blaine Spring Lake Park Life, Coon Rapids, Weekly
 Bloomington Sun Current, Bloomington, Weekly
 Brooklyn Center Sun Post, Brooklyn Center, Weekly
 Brooklyn Park Sun Post, Brooklyn Park, Weekly
 Burnsville / Eagan Sun Thisweek, Burnsville, Weekly
 The Caledonia Argus, Caledonia, Weekly
 Carver County News, Watertown, Weekly
 Champlin-Dayton Press, Weekly
 Chisholm Tribune-Press, Chisholm, Weekly
 Columbia Heights / Fridley Sun Focus, Fridley, Weekly
 Crow River News, Osseo, Weekly
 Crystal / Robbinsdale Sun Post, Crystal, Weekly
 Dakota County Tribune, Apple ValleyWeekly
 Eden Prairie Sun Current, Eden Prairie, Weekly
 Edina Sun Current, Edina, Weekly
 Star News, Elk River, Weekly
 Excelsior / Shorewood Sun Sailor, Edina, Weekly
 Faribault Daily News, Faribault, Daily, Tuesday thru Saturday
 Forest Lake Times, Forest Lake, Weekly
 The Gazette, Stillwater, Weekly
 Grand Rapids Herald-Review, Grand Rapids, Weekly
 Hibbing Daily Tribune, Hibbing, Daily, except Monday
 Hopkins / Minnetonka Sun Sailor, Minnetonka, Daily
 Isanti County Times, Cambridge, Weekly
 The Kenyon Leader, Kenyon, Weekly
 Laker Pioneer, Wayzata, Weekly
 Lakeville Sun Thisweek, Lakeville, Weekly
 Le Center Leader, Le Center, Weekly
 Le Sueur News-Herald, Le Sueur, Weekly
 Le Sueur County News, Le Sueur, Weekly
 The Leader, Blooming Prairie, Ellendale, Weekly
 Lonsdale Area News-Review, Lonsdale, Weekly
 Maple Grove & Osseo Press, Maple Grove & Osseo, Weekly
 Mesabi Daily News, Mesabi, Daily, except Monday
 Mille Lacs Messenger, Isle, Weekly
 Monticello Times, Monticello, Weekly
 Morrison County Record, Little Falls, Weekly
 Mounds View / New Brighton Sun Focus, Mounds View, Weekly
 New Hope / Golden Valley Sun Post, Golden Valley, Weekly
 Northfield News, Northfield, Weekly
 Norwood Young America Times, Norwood Young America, Weekly
 Osseo-Maple Grove Press, Osseo & Maple Grove, Weekly
 The Pilot-Independent, Walker, Weekly
 Owatonna People's Press, Owatonna, Daily, Tuesday thru Saturday
 Plymouth Sun Sailor, Plymouth, Weekly
 The Post Review, Cambridge, Weekly
 Richfield Sun Current, Richfield, Weekly
 Star News, Elk River, Weekly
 St. Louis Park Sun Sailor, St. Louis Park, Weekly
 St. Peter Herald, Saint Peter, Weekly
 Sun-Post, Brooklyn Center & Brooklyn Park, Weekly
 Union-Times, Princeton, Weekly
 Waconia Patriot, Waconia, Weekly
 Walker Pilot-Independent, Walker, Weekly
 Waseca County News, Weekly

Wisconsin:
 Antigo Daily Journal, Antigo, WI, Daily
 Ashland Daily Press, Ashland, WI, Weekly
 Beloit Daily News, Beloit, WI, Daily
 Cambridge News & Deerfield Independent, Cambridge & Deerfield, WI, Weekly
 The Chronotype, Rice Lake, WI, Weekly
 The Country Today, Eau Claire, WI, Weekly
 The Courier, Waterloo & Marshall, WI, Weekly
 Daily Jefferson County Union, Fort Atkinson, WI, Daily
 DeForest Times-Tribune, DeForest, WI, Weekly
 Eagle Herald, Marinette, WI, Daily
 The Gazette, Janesville, WI, Daily
 Herald-Independent & McFarland Thistle, Cottage Grove, Monona & McFarland, WI, Weekly
 Lake Mills Leader, Lake Mills, WI, Weekly
 Leader-Telegram, Eau Claire, WI, Daily
 Lodi Enterprise & Poynette Press, Lodi & Poynette, WI, Weekly
 Milton Courier, Milton, WI, Weekly
 Price County Review, Park Falls, Phillips, WI, Weekly
 Sawyer County Record, Hayward, WI, Weekly
 Spooner Advocate, Spooner, WI, Weekly
 Sun Prairie Star, Sun Prairie, WI, Twice Weekly
 Watertown Daily Times'', Watertown, WI, Daily
 Waunakee Tribune, Waunakee, WI, Weekly

References

Newspaper companies of the United States
Companies based in Tennessee
2013 establishments in Minnesota